The 1982–83 Copa del Rey was the 81st staging of the Spanish Cup, the annual domestic football cup competition in Spain. The tournament was attended by 135 teams from the higher echelons of Spanish football.

The tournament began on 8 September 1982 and ended on 4 June 1983 with the final, held in La Romareda Stadium in Zaragoza, in which FC Barcelona were crowned for the twentieth time in their history, after beating the defending champions of the tournament, Real Madrid CF by a score of 2–1.

This was the fourth time these two teams had met in the final, known as El Clásico, with a favourable balance for the Catalans.

Format 

 All rounds are played over two legs except the final which is played a single match in a neutral venue. The team that has the higher aggregate score over the two legs progresses to the next round.
 In case of a tie on aggregate, will play an extra time of 30 minutes, and if still tied, will be decided with a penalty shoot-outs.
 The teams that play European competitions are exempt until the round of 16 or when they are removed from the tournament.
 The winners of the competition will earn a place in the group stage of next season's UEFA Cup Winners' Cup, if they have not already qualified for European competition, if so then the runners-up will instead take this berth.

First round

Second round

Third round

Fourth round

Bracket

Round of 16 

|}

First leg

Second leg

Quarter-finals 

|}

First leg

Second leg

Semi-finals 

|}

First leg

Second leg

Final

References

External links 

  RSSSF
  Linguasport
  Youtube: Final '83 - Real Madrid CF vs FC Barcelona (full match)

Copa del Rey seasons
1982–83 in Spanish football cups